Mehrak (also known as Mehrak Lāghereh and Rūd-e Mardak) is a village in Zohan Rural District, Zohan District, Zirkuh County, South Khorasan Province, Iran. At the 2006 census, its population was 202, in 53 families.

References 

Populated places in Zirkuh County